This is a list of African-American newspapers that have been published in Connecticut.  It includes both current and historical newspapers. 

Connecticut's first newspaper by and for African Americans was The Clarksonian, published from 1843 to 1844 in Hartford.  The first known paper after that came much later, however, with the Hartford Herald in 1918.  Connecticut's African American community has also historically been served by papers from neighboring states such as Massachusetts.
  
African-American newspapers in Connecticut today include the Inner-City News of New Haven and the Inquiring News of Hartford (successor to the Inquirer family of newspapers in Bridgeport, Hartford, New Haven, and Waterbury).

Newspapers

See also 
List of African-American newspapers and media outlets
List of African-American newspapers in Massachusetts
List of African-American newspapers in New York
List of African-American newspapers in Rhode Island
List of newspapers in Connecticut

Works cited

References 

Newspapers
Connecticut
African-American
African-American newspapers